Pryor Cliff is a distinctive rock cliff in Antarctica. It is five nautical miles (9 km) northeast of Mount Nickens at the north end of the Hudson Mountains facing north towards the Cosgrove Ice Shelf. Mapped by United States Geological Survey (USGS) from surveys and U.S. Navy air photos, 1960–1966. It was named by Advisory Committee on Antarctic Names (US-ACAN) for Douglas A. Pryor, a map compilation specialist who contributed significantly to drafting USGS sketch maps of Antarctica.

References

Hudson Mountains
Cliffs of Ellsworth Land
Volcanoes of Ellsworth Land